George Ellis Baker (March 16, 1816 – October 2, 1887) was an American merchant, town clerk and state legislator.

Early life
Baker was born on March 16, 1816, in Dedham, Massachusetts. He was the eldest son of six children born to John Baker (1780–1843) and Patty ( Ellis) Baker (1791–1876). His father served as the sheriff of Norfolk County from 1834 until his death in 1843. His brother was Fisher Ames Baker, a prominent and successful attorney who had served in the Civil War.

Baker was descended from Richard Baker, who landed in the Massachusetts Bay Colony in 1635 and settled in Dorchester. After five generations in Dorchester, the Bakers moved to Dedham, Massachusetts.

Career
Baker moved to Troy, New York, where he opened a shoe store. The business was not a success, so he relocated again to Williamsburg, Brooklyn in the early 1840s before opening another shoe store on Maiden Lane in Manhattan. While this store failed to catch on, Baker successfully became involved in politics.

He was clerk of the board of trustees of the village of Williamsburg and a census taker. In 1850, he was elected on the Whig ticket to the New York State Assembly which met in Albany from January 7 to July 11, 1851, during the first year of Washington Hunt's governorship. While in Albany, he attached himself to former governor and then U.S. Senator William Henry Seward, serving as his private secretary in the 1860's. After President Abraham Lincoln appointed Seward U.S. Secretary of State, Seward had Baker appointed disbursing clerk and administrator of the Secret Service Fund.

Personal life
Baker was married to Eveline Stevens (1817–1903). She was a daughter of James Stevens and granddaughter of Capt. William C. Stevens of the Continental Army. Together, they were the parents of:

 George Fisher Baker (1840–1931), who married Florence Tucker Baker, a daughter of Benjamin Franklin Baker, in 1869.
 Martha Elizabeth Baker (1842–1910), who married banker Grant Barney Schley.
 Eveline Frances Baker (1844–1867), who died unmarried at age 23.

Baker died in Washington, D.C., on October 2, 1887. He was buried at Oak Hill Cemetery there. His widow died in 1903 and was also buried in Washington, D.C.

Descendants
Through his son George, he was a grandfather of Evelyn Baker (who married Howard Bligh St. George); Florence Bellows Baker (who married William Goadby Loew); and George Fisher Baker Jr. (who married Edith Brevoort Kane; their daughter Elizabeth married John M. Schiff and their son, George F. Baker III married Frances Drexel Munn, a daughter of Mary Astor Paul and member of the Drexel banking family).

Through his daughter Martha, he was a grandfather of Chaloner Baker Schley; Grant Barney Schley Jr.; Evander "Van" Baker Schley (who married Sophie Beverly Duer, a granddaughter of U.S. Representative William Duer, in 1931); Evelyn Baker (wife of Max Howell Behr, brother to Karl Behr) and aviator Kenneth Baker Schley.

References
Notes

Sources

External links

 Correspondence from George Ellis Baker, undated Baker Library Special Collections, Harvard Business School, Harvard University

1816 births
1887 deaths
New York (state) Whigs
Members of the New York State Assembly
19th-century American politicians
19th-century American businesspeople
Burials at Oak Hill Cemetery (Washington, D.C.)
George